Joe's Violin is a 2016 American short documentary film directed by Kahane Cooperman, and produced by Kahane Cooperman and Raphaela Neihausen, that follows a moment in the life of a Polish survivor of the Holocaust from the time he decides to drop off his 70-year-old violin during a local instrument drive through the violin's acquisition by a new owner, a 12-year-old girl from the Bronx, and recounts how the experience changes both their lives.

Cast 

 Joe Feingold - as himself. Holocaust survivor.
 Regina Feingold
 Brianna Perez - as herself. School girl.
 Kathleen Drohan

Reception
The film premiered at the Tribeca Film Festival on 14 April 2016.

Awards
 2017: Academy Awards   Best Documentary Short Subject - Nominated

References

External links
 Official website
 
 Joe's Violin at The New Yorker
 Joe's Violin on Kickstarter

2016 films
2016 short documentary films
American short documentary films
Kickstarter-funded documentaries
2010s English-language films
2010s American films
Works originally published in The New Yorker